The Earp Vendetta Ride was a deadly search by a federal posse led by Deputy U.S. Marshal Wyatt Earp for a loose confederation of outlaw "Cowboys" they believed had ambushed his brothers Virgil and Morgan Earp, maiming the former and killing the latter. The two Earp brothers had been attacked in retaliation for the deaths of three Cowboys in the Gunfight at the O.K. Corral on October 26, 1881. From March 20 to April 15, 1882, the federal posse searched southeast Cochise County, Arizona Territory for the men they believed were responsible for the attacks on Virgil and Morgan. Several suspects had been identified and were charged, but were soon released by the court, owing in some cases to legal technicalities and in others to the strength of alibis provided by Cowboy confederates. Wyatt hoped that the legal system would bring the Cowboys to justice, but after suspects in both ambushes were freed, Wyatt resolved to take matters into his own hands.

On March 20, two days after Morgan's murder, Wyatt Earp and his brothers Warren and James along with Doc Holliday, and two other deputies were escorting Virgil and his wife Allie to a California-bound train in Tucson. They learned that suspects Ike Clanton and  Frank Stilwell were already waiting there. After Virgil, Allie, and James boarded the train, Wyatt spotted two men near the train that he thought were Clanton and Stilwell. He and several men chased down and killed Stilwell, but lost the other. After Stilwell's body was found the next morning, the Tucson Justice of the Peace issued arrest warrants for the five lawmen suspected of the extra-judicial murder. When the men returned to Tombstone, Cochise County Sheriff Johnny Behan had received a telegram notifying him of the Tucson warrants, and attempted to detain the five members of Earp's federal posse named in the warrants, but they ignored him. Still carrying arrest warrants for Curly Bill Brocius and others, they left Tombstone to pursue further Cowboys implicated in the attacks.

Behan formed a Cochise County sheriff's posse consisting of deputies Phineas Clanton, Johnny Ringo, and about twenty other Cowboys and Arizona ranchers. Based on the local warrants, they followed the Earp posse and set out to arrest them.  The large sheriff's posse came close to, but never engaged, the much smaller Earp posse, which  received help from local businessmen and ranchers (and at one point, published a letter in a Tombstone newspaper taunting Behan and his men). The federal posse ultimately killed four men, starting with Stilwell and ending with Brocius. About April 15 the Earps and some of their associates rode out of Arizona Territory, headed for New Mexico Territory.

Background 

After a long-simmering feud and increasing animosity and threats, Tombstone town Marshal Virgil Earp, Assistant Town Marshal Morgan Earp, and temporary deputy marshals Wyatt Earp and Doc Holliday confronted outlaw Cowboys Billy Claiborne, Ike and Billy Clanton, and Tom and Frank McLaury in the Gunfight at the O.K. Corral on October 26, 1881. The 30-second gunfight is generally regarded as the most famous gunfight in the history of the American Wild West. The lawmen killed three of the Cowboys during the gunfight. Ike Clanton filed murder charges, and after a month-long  preliminary hearing, Justice of the Peace Wells Spicer found that the lawmen had acted within their duty. But Spicer's finding did not end the matter for Clanton and other Cowboys.

Attempted murder of Virgil Earp 

At about 11:30 pm on December 28, 1881, just over two months after the Gunfight at the O.K. Corral, three men ambushed Virgil Earp as he walked from Schieffelin Hall back to the Cosmopolitan Hotel, where the Earps had moved for mutual support and protection. He was hit in the back and upper left arm by about 20 buckshot pellets, shattering his humerus. Dr. George Goodfellow, who treated him, had to remove  of bone. Wyatt telegraphed U.S. Marshal Crawley Dake. He requested appointment as Deputy U.S. Marshal for eastern Pima County and authority to form a posse.

Commenting on Earp's request to Dake, the Weekly Arizona Miner wrote on December 30, 1881 about the repeated threats received by the Earps and others.

Wyatt deputizes posse 

Dake replied affirmatively by telegraph, and Deputy U.S. Marshal Wyatt Earp deputized Warren Earp, Doc Holliday, Sherman McMaster, Jack "Turkey Creek" Johnson, Charlie "Hairlip Charlie" Smith, Daniel "Tip" Tipton, and John "Texas Jack" Vermillion to protect the family and pursue the suspects, paying them $5 a day.

McMaster and Johnson were known as tough men who knew how to use their guns. McMaster had seen service with the Texas Rangers in 1878–1879 when his unit captured and held Curly Bill Brocius prisoner for five months. In Tombstone, McMaster had also been accused of stealing U.S. Army mules and robbing a stage with outlaw Charles "Pony" Diehl. Fluent in Spanish, McMaster used his inside knowledge of the Cowboys to assist the Earps in their search. He also liked fine horses.

Jack "Turkey Creek" Johnson, whose real name according to Wyatt Earp was John William Blount, was a native of Missouri who was raised in the lead mining area near Neosho. Blount was forced to flee Missouri in 1877 after he and his brother were involved in a violent street battle. During May 1881, his brother Bud killed a man in a quarrel in Tip Top, Arizona Territory, and was sent to Yuma Territorial Prison. John Blount adopted the alias Jack Johnson and went to Tombstone seeking Wyatt Earp's help to get his brother pardoned. Wyatt helped by writing a petition to Governor Fremont, whom Wyatt knew, and Bud Blount was eventually freed. As a way to repay his debt, Johnson joined the posse.

Charlie Smith had a long-time connection to the Earp family, and was fluent in Spanish after spending several years in Texas working in saloons. While in Fort Worth he had been associated with barman James Earp, and participated in at least two gunfights there, and was seriously wounded in 1878. Arriving in Tombstone in 1879 with Robert J. Winders, Smith immediately became associated with the Earps. Winders and the Earps partnered on the Mountain Maid mine.

Daniel "Tip" Tipton arrived in Tombstone in March 1881. He had a shady reputation earned during the early days of the mining boom in Virginia City, Nevada Territory. Tipton, a former Union seaman in the Civil War, was tattooed on his hands and forearms, and took up mining and gambling after the war. In 1879 he was in the Gunnison district of Colorado before traveling to Tombstone at the request of his friend Lou Rickabaugh, also a friend of the Earps. Smith and Tipton were gamblers who supplemented their income with mining ventures.

John "Texas Jack" Vermillion, a Virginian, joined the vendetta ride after Frank Stilwell was killed, and was never indicted for Stilwell's murder, but he was with the Earps when Florentino "Indian Charlie" Cruz was killed. Although closer to friend and fellow Southerner Doc Holliday than the Earps, Vermillion remained by Wyatt Earp's side during the shootout at Iron Springs with Curly Bill Brocius. A veteran of the Civil War on the Confederate side who rode with J.E.B. Stuart's Virginia cavalry, Vermillion was an accomplished horseman and pistoleer.

U.S. Marshal Dake visited Tombstone in late January 1881 with acting Governor John J. Gosper. Dake had previously and unsuccessfully requested financial assistance from the United States Attorney General, Wayne MacVeagh, to help track down and arrest the Cowboys. Dake's superior told him he must reduce his official debt below the penalty bond of $20,000 before an additional appropriation could be made. In September 1881, Governor Gosper told Secretary of Interior Kirkwood that Arizona contained "a small army of outlaws well armed and fully able to cope with the ordinary civil powers of our counties." Not believing that the federal bureaucracy would provide funds, Dake borrowed $3,000 from Wells Fargo & Co., promising that the Department of Justice would repay it. He deposited money, variously reported as either $300 or $3000, to an account in the Hudson & Company Bank, minus $15, for use "to arrest all parties committing crimes against the United States." The following day John Thacker from Wells Fargo went with Wyatt to the bank to authorize his use of the funds. Dake was later accused, although not convicted, of spending $300 on gambling and prostitutes while in Tombstone and misappropriating most of the rest of the money.

Outlaw Cowboy warrants 

In January 1882, Wyatt Earp sought and received warrants from Judge William H. Stilwell for the arrest of the men thought responsible for ambushing Virgil. Judge Stilwell was among a number of Cochise County citizens unhappy with Sheriff Behan's failure to stop the Cowboys' ongoing criminal activity.

On January 17, 1882, Johnny Ringo and Doc Holliday had traded threats, resulting in their arrest by Tombstone's chief of police, James Flynn. Both were fined and Judge Stilwell noted that charges were still outstanding against Ringo for a robbery in Galeyville. Ringo was rearrested and jailed on January 20.

On January 23, Wyatt rode with his deputized posse, consisting of his brothers Morgan and Warren, Doc Holliday, "Texas Jack" Vermillion and four others, to Charleston, Arizona where Ike Clanton, his brother Phin, and Pony Diehl were known to stay. Ringo, still in jail, learned that the Earps had warrants and were headed for Charleston. He arranged for bail and Sheriff Behan released him before the bail payment arrived. James Earp immediately filed an affidavit saying Ringo was "an escaped prisoner" and charged that Ringo intended to interfere with Wyatt's execution of the warrants. Ringo immediately rode to Charleston to warn his Cowboy friends.

On the way to Charleston, Earp's posse was joined by 30 more riders from Tombstone. They found Ben Maynard, a known Cowboy associate, outside Charleston and arrested him. With Maynard in front, the posse took over the small town and went door-to-door looking for the Clantons and Diehl. Ringo was rearrested in Charleston, but not before he warned the Clantons and Diehl, who left town. The next day the posse scouted the countryside, eventually stopping at a camp near Tombstone known as "Pick-em-up".  Complicating matters, a Tombstone deputy sheriff rode out to Pick-em-up and served a warrant on McMaster, who was accused of stealing two horses from the Contention mine. The Earp posse rode back into Tombstone where Sherman McMaster made bail. He and Charlie Smith took a room at the Cosmopolitan Hotel near the Earps.

On January 30, Ike and Phin Clanton surrendered to Wells Fargo agent Charley Bartholomew and were jailed in Tombstone. They learned that the warrant was not for armed robbery as they thought, but for "assault with intent to commit murder, the specific offense being the waylaying and shooting of Virgil Earp some weeks ago."

On February 2, the Clantons were tried before Judge Stilwell. Ike's hat had been found at the scene and McMaster testified that he had heard Ike talk about the shooting in Charleston later that evening. He said that when Ike learned that Virgil had survived the shooting, Ike said he "would have to go back and do the job over." However, Charleston constable George McKelvey, saloon owner J. B. Ayers, and five others testified that Ike Clanton had been in Charleston and could not have taken part in the shooting. The charges were dismissed for lack of evidence. Wyatt said later that Judge Stilwell told him, "Wyatt, you'll never clean up this crowd this way; next time you'd better leave your prisoners in the brush where alibis don't count."

Ike Clanton refiled murder charges against the Earps and Doc Holliday in Contention, Arizona for their killing of his brother and the McLaury brothers. When he could not provide new evidence, the charges were dismissed. On February 13, Wyatt mortgaged his home to lawyer James G. Howard for $365.00 (about $ today), but was never able to repay the loan and in 1884 Howard foreclosed on the house. On February 17, the Earp posse left Tombstone heavily armed and with a warrant for the arrest of "Pony" Diehl, who was suspected in a January 1882 stage robbery. Unsuccessful, they returned to town a few days later, hearing rumors that the Cowboys were plotting further revenge.

Morgan Earp assassinated 

On Saturday evening, March 18, 1882, Tombstone's Scheifflin Hall was host to Stolen Kisses, a play by William Horace Lingard and Company. Despite having received death threats earlier that day, Morgan, Doc Holliday, and Dan Tipton attended. Wyatt and Benjamin Goodrich cautioned against attending. Afterward, Doc went to his room and Morgan and Tipton headed for Hatch's Saloon and Billiard Parlor, which had become their unofficial headquarters after the Oriental Hotel was sold. Morgan and Bob Hatch began a game of pool and Wyatt, Tipton, and McMaster watched. The table was near the back door.

At 10:50 pm, someone fired two shots through the window of the back door. One bullet passed through Morgan, shattered his spine, and then lodged in the thigh of George A. B. Berry. Another bullet struck the wall over Wyatt's head. Wyatt, McMaster and Tipton pulled Morgan out of the line of fire while Hatch dashed outside looking for the shooters.  Morgan died within the hour.

Cowboy suspects identified 

While Wyatt and James were traveling to Contention with Morgan's body, Coroner Dr. D.M. Mathew held an inquest into Morgan's death. During the Coroner's Inquest, Pete Spence's wife, Marietta Duarte, implicated her husband and four other men in Morgan's murder. She testified that along with her husband, Frank Stilwell, a man named "Fries" (later identified as Frederick Bode), and two Indians (later identified as Hank Swilling and Florentino Cruz) took part in the killing. She testified that four days before the shooting she and her mother were standing at Spence's house when Morgan walked by. "The Indian then started down the street, & got ahead of him to get a good look at him." She also stated that on the night of the shooting she and her mother heard the shots, and a few minutes later Stilwell and "Indian Charley" came into her home, followed shortly by Spence, Bode and the other Indian.

Marietta Duarte recalled that the men were excited, and the next morning her husband threatened her with violence if she told what she knew. "Spence didn't tell me so, but I know he killed Morgan Earp", she said. Additional witnesses said they saw Frank Stilwell running from the scene.

Like the gunfight three months earlier, Morgan's murder was national news. The Angeles Herald reported:

The coroner's jury concluded that Spence, Stilwell, Fries, and "two half-breed Indians" were responsible for Morgan's murder.

Suspects in jail 

Unknown to Wyatt, three of the Cowboys he sought were in Behan's jail. After the Coroner's Jury ended, Spence immediately turned himself in, protected in Behan's jail. On the day of the inquest, two of Behan's deputy sheriffs arrested two more suspects for other reasons. Cochise County Deputy Sheriff William Bell brought Indian Charlie from Charleston and placed him under arrest in the Tombstone jail for shooting a man in Charleston. Separately, Cochise County Deputy Sheriff Frank Hereford arrested "John Doe" Freeze. They were all later released.

Wyatt seeks revenge 

When Wyatt Earp learned of the judge's ruling, he felt he could not rely on the court system for justice. Stilwell had previously been acquitted of two homicides and a stage robbery, and in Wyatt Earp's opinion, he and other Cowboys had gotten away with murder again. Wyatt decided to take matters into his own hands—concluding that the only way to deal with Virgil's and Morgan's attackers, and the continued threat against the entire Earp family, was to kill the responsible Cowboys.

Stilwell shooting in Tucson 

On Sunday, March 19, the day after Morgan's murder, Deputy U.S. Marshal Wyatt Earp, his brother James, and a group of friends prepared to accompany Virgil and his wife, along with Morgan's body, to the rail head in Benson. From there James would accompany them to the family home in Colton, California. Morgan's wife and parents waited to bury him. Wyatt borrowed a 10 gauge double barreled Spencer shotgun from Fred Dodge.

Earp assembles deputies 

On Monday, Wyatt received information that Frank Stilwell, Ike Clanton, Hank Swilling, and another cowboy were watching the passenger trains in Tucson intending to kill Virgil Earp. He thought getting the still invalid Virgil through to Tucson safely would require extra help. Wyatt, accompanied by Warren Earp, Doc Holliday, "Turkey Creek" Jack Johnson, and Sherman McMaster, guarded Virgil and Allie. In Contention City they stabled their horses and picked up an extra wagon. They rode in the wagon to the rail head in Benson, where they caught the next train to Tucson.

They were all heavily armed with shotguns or rifles, except Virgil who had a pistol. Nathan W. Waite of Ash Canyon in the Huachuca Mountains was on the train with the Earp party. He said the Earp men were all armed and McMaster was wearing two cartridge belts.

Cowboys in Tucson 

In Tucson, the party was greeted at the train station by Deputy U.S. Marshal Joseph W. Evans. Virgil and other witnesses later reported that they saw Stilwell, Ike Clanton, and other Cowboys at the train station. "Almost the first men we met on the platform there were Stilwell and his friends, armed to the teeth", Virgil later told the San Francisco Examiner. "They fell back into the crowd as soon as they saw I had an escort, and the boys took me to the hotel to supper." Watched over by the well-armed Wyatt and his posse, Virgil and Allie had dinner in Tucson at Porter's Hotel.
 Marshal Evans saw Holliday deposit two shotguns at the railroad station office.

Stilwell killed 

After the Earp group finished dinner at Porter's Hotel they returned to the train. Holliday asked someone to get his shotguns. Wyatt escorted Virgil and Allie aboard the train. A passenger told Virgil he saw men lying on a flatcar near the engine. Wyatt saw them too and slipped between the tracks, looking for the men. As the train pulled away from the Tucson station at about 7:15 p.m., six or seven shots were heard. George Hand, who saw the body, said Stilwell was "the worst shot up man I ever saw."

Stilwell's wounds 

Coroner Dr. Dexter Lyford found a single bullet wound through Stilwell's body under his armpits; a wound from a rifle through the upper left arm; a buckshot wound that passed through the liver, abdomen, and stomach; another buckshot wound that fractured his left leg; and a rifle wound through the right leg. The coroner concluded that Stilwell had been shot by five different weapons. Either the gun shot under his arm or through the abdomen could have been the cause of death.

The Tombstone Epitaph reported the next day that Stilwell had been shot six times. Many years later, Wyatt told his biographer Flood that he and his party had seen Clanton and Stilwell on the tracks with weapons, and he had shot Stilwell.

The federal deputies looked hard for another man, whom Wyatt identified as Ike Clanton, but he got away. Ike claimed in a newspaper interview afterward that he and Stilwell had been in Tucson to respond to a federal subpoena for interfering with a U.S. mail carrier when he allegedly robbed the Sandy Bob line of the Bisbee stage on September 8, 1881. The federal charges had been filed by Virgil Earp after Stilwell was acquitted for lack of evidence on the state charges of robbery.

Clanton said he had heard that the Earps were coming in on a train to kill Stilwell. According to Clanton, Stilwell left the hotel and was last seen walking down the railroad tracks away from the Porter Hotel, towards where his body was later found on the tracks. Virgil later told the Examiner, "One thing is certain, if I had been without an escort they would have killed me."

The next day, the newspapers were full of news about Frank Stilwell's death. The Arizona Star reported,

The Coroner's Jury in Tucson found that Stilwell had died at the hands of Wyatt and Warren Earp, Holliday, McMaster, and Johnson. Tucson Justice of the Peace Charles Meyer issued arrest warrants for the five men.

Earp posse pursues Outlaw Cowboys 

On the night of March 20, after killing Stilwell in Tucson, and verifying that the train was on its way to California with the rest of their family, the Earp party was afoot. (The station was later renamed Esmond and was the site of a head-on train crash in 1903 at the current location of the Desert Sky Middle School in Tucson.) At the Papago stop they flagged down the night-freight train back to the terminal in Benson.

Once in Benson they hired a wagon back to Contention where they picked up their stabled horses. They rode into Tombstone around 11:00 a.m. on Tuesday, March 21. Once in Tombstone they learned of Marietta Duarte's testimony during the coroner's inquest into Morgan's death. She told the jury that her husband Pete Spence and several others who she identified had talked about the murder in her home. The Earps returned to their rooms upstairs at the Cosmopolitan Hotel, where they had lived in close company and used as their temporary headquarters since the first attack on Virgil in December.

Wyatt and Warren Earp, J.H. Holliday, Texas Jack, "Turkey Creek" Johnson, and Sherman McMaster were now wanted men due to the outstanding warrants.  Tucson, where the Earps had killed Stilwell, was in the jurisdiction of Pima County Sheriff Bob Paul, a friend of the Earps. He and District Attorney Alex Campbell sent a telegram to Behan in Tombstone asking him to arrest the Earps. The telegraph office manager was a friend to the Earps and showed the message to Wyatt before it was delivered to Behan. The operator agreed to delay delivering the message to Behan long enough to allow the Earps and their associates to make ready to leave town Tuesday evening.  The Earps sent instructions to Montgomery's stable to get their horses saddled.

Early in the evening Behan received the delayed telegram. He gathered his deputies and Tombstone City Marshal Dave Neagle. They met in front of the Cosmopolitan Hotel, preparing to arrest the five men. Behan encountered the heavily armed Earp lawmen as they passed through the lobby of the Cosmopolitan Hotel, getting ready to pick up their horses from the stable and leave town. Cochise County Sheriff Behan told the Deputy U.S. Marshal, "Wyatt I want to see you." Wyatt replied without stopping, "Johnny, if you're not careful, you'll see me once too often."

The Tombstone Epitaph reported, "The Sheriff made a weak attempt to arrest them at the Cosmopolitan Hotel before they left, but Wyatt Earp told him he didn't want to see him; that he had seen him once too often, and thereupon the Earp party mounted their horses and rode away.". One of Behan's deputies, Billy Breakenridge, claimed Wyatt and his men resisted arrest and even pulled their guns on Behan and Dave Neagle, one of Wyatt's friends, to prevent their arrest. In a story published on May 14, 1893, Wyatt told a reporter for the Denver Republican:

Wyatt and Warren Earp, Doc Holliday, Johnson and McMaster were joined by "Texas Jack" Vermillion, Dan Tipton, Charlie Smith, Fred Dodge, Johnny Green, and Louis Cooley to form a federal posse under Wyatt's authority as the Deputy US Marshal. Continuing to ignore Behan, the Earp posse rode out of town the same evening of Tuesday, March 21.

The next morning Behan formed a posse consisting of a number of deputized Cowboys, friends of Frank Stilwell and Ike Clanton, including Johnny Ringo, Phineas Clanton, Johnny Barnes and about 18 more men. They rode after the federal posse and the five men wanted for Stilwell's murder.  Paul was on his way to Tombstone the next day when he ran into Behan and his posse on the road  outside of town. He joined the posse and rode with them to Contention that night and on to Tombstone the next day. Without sleep for two days, Paul told Behan to wake him if he got news of the Earp's location, but Behan left without him. In 1898, Paul wrote the Tucson Republican that the Earps had spied Stillwell "standing on a gravel car peeking into the window of the car that Virgil Earp was in."

Killing of Florentino Cruz 

According to Theodore Judah, who witnessed events at the wood camp, the Earp posse arrived around 11:00 am and asked him about the location of Pete Spence and Florentino "Indian Charlie" Cruz. He told them Spence was in jail in Tombstone and that Cruz was cutting wood nearby. They followed the direction Judah indicated and Judah soon heard ten or twelve shots fired. Judah looked for Cruz that night without success. The next morning he went looking for him again and found his body full of bullet holes.

One apocryphal account says that after the party recognized Cruz, they chased him down and a gunfight ensued. The party managed to capture a fatally wounded Cruz and he confessed to have taken part in Morgan's murder, and that he identified Stilwell, Hank Swilling, Curly Bill and Johnny Ringo as the others who killed Morgan. During that time, in Wyatt's own account, he allowed Cruz to keep his revolver in his holster to "give him a chance to fight like a man". After Cruz's confession, Wyatt gave him the permission to draw his revolver, which Cruz did, but Wyatt managed to draw his gun first and killed him with one shot. Wyatt's account of him killing Cruz in a duel is contradicted by Cruz' fatal wounds, one to the temple and the second through his right side.

Behan arrests two 

On Thursday, March 23, Smith and Tipton left the main body of the posse to obtain information and money in Tombstone. Behan saw Smith and Tipton in town and arrested them for "resisting arrest and conspiracy." The men immediately paid their bond. Smith left Tombstone to rejoin the federal posse but Tipton remained behind. When Smith rejoined the group, Earp asked him to return to town and raise $1,000 to cover the posse's expense. Earp later said he told Smith, “Meet us at Iron Springs, and don’t lose any time. We’ll be waiting there.”

On March 27 Smith and Tipton were brought before Judge A.J. Felter in Tombstone. The defense asked the judge to dismiss the charges because Behan lacked a warrant and the judge agreed, freeing the men.

Cruz autopsy 

The Arizona Weekly Star had previously identified "Florentino Saiz" as "the 1878 murderer of Deputy U.S. Marshals Cornelius Finley and John Hicks Adams on September 2, 1878, and Cruz and Saiz may have been the same person.

On Friday, March 24 in Tombstone, Dr. George Goodfellow, acting as coroner, examined Cruz's body.  At the coroner's inquest, Goodfellow testified that he found four wounds in Cruz: one shot through his right temple entering the brain; a "slight flesh wound to the right shoulder"; a third entering his right side and exiting to the right of his spine; and the fourth hitting him in the left thigh and exiting "seven or eight inches above the point of entry." He stated that either the first or third wound were sufficient to cause death. The coroner's jury ruled that Cruz had been killed by Wyatt and Warren Earp, Sherman McMaster, Jack Johnson, Doc Holliday, Texas Jack and two other unnamed gunmen (Dan Tipton and Charlie Smith).

On the day of the inquest, Arizona Territory Governor Tritle arrived in Tombstone to look into the "sad state of affairs here." On the same day, the two remaining members of the Earp family departed Tombstone. The Tombstone Epitaph reported that both James Earp's wife Bessie and Wyatt's common-law wife Mattie were departing for Colton, California, where the rest of the Earp family had moved.

Gunfight with Curly Bill 

The spring was located in the Whetstone Mountains west of Tombstone and was later renamed Mescal Springs. Some modern researchers believe it is actually Cottonwood Springs. The actual location is uncertain.

With Wyatt and Doc Holliday in the lead, the six lawmen surmounted a small rise overlooking the springs and were surprised to find nine Cowboys already there: Curly Bill, Pony Diehl, Johnny Barnes, Frank Patterson, Milt Hicks, Bill Hicks, Bill Johnson, Ed Lyle, and Johnny Lyle. They were camped about the springs, cooking a meal, less than  down a slight embankment. Once again, the odds were not in the lawmen's favor.

Curly Bill's death 

Recognizing Earp, Curly Bill fired his shotgun without warning at Wyatt but missed. Eighteen months earlier, Wyatt had protected Curly Bill against a mob ready to lynch him for killing Tombstone Town Marshal Fred White, and then provided testimony that helped spare Curly Bill from a murder trial. Wyatt Earp and Doc Holliday wrote about the fight, and Fred Dodge interviewed three participants afterward. Earp dismounted, carrying a 22-inch, 10-gauge stagecoach shotgun he had borrowed from Fred Dodge. The other Cowboys fired at the lawmen. "Texas Jack" Vermillion’s horse was killed and fell on him, pinning his leg. Vermillion was unable to retrieve his rifle wedged in the scabbard under his fallen horse. Doc Holliday pulled Vermillion from under his horse, and they, Johnson and McMaster shot at the Cowboys as they sought cover.

Wyatt returned fire across his horse with his own shotgun and hit Curly Bill in the chest, almost cutting him in half. Curly Bill fell into the water by the edge of the spring and lay dead. The lawmen's fire was so intense that, according to Johnny Barnes, the Cowboys who could, "got away."

After killing Brocius, Earp fired his pistol and shot Johnny Barnes in the chest and Milt Hicks in the arm. Attempting to remount his horse, Wyatt had trouble getting up into the saddle because his cartridge belt had slipped down around his thighs. He was finally able to get on his horse and retreat.

Wyatt unhurt 

The Cowboys fired a number of shots at the Earp party without effect. McMaster was grazed by a bullet that cut through the straps of his field glasses or possibly his coat. Later accounts of the gun fight varied. Wyatt reported that his long coat was punctured by bullets or buck shot on both sides. Another bullet struck his boot heel and his saddle-horn was hit as well, burning the saddle hide and narrowly missing Wyatt. In his unpublished 1926 biography of Earp, John H. Flood wrote,

Ed Colburn wrote in a letter published in the Ford County Globe on May 23, 1882 that he had visited with Wyatt and Warren Earp in Gunnison, Colorado. In the letter he relayed Earp's story about how his overcoat was hit on both sides of his body by a charge of buckshot and that his saddle horn was shot off.

The Tombstone Epitaph reported on March 27 that Wyatt "received seven shots through his clothes," and that McMaster's clothing was shot through once, that Texas Jack's horse had been killed, and the pommel of Wyatt's saddle had been shot off.

Flood described Vermillion several times as being a relative stranger to the Earps, although he had been one of Virgil's city deputies. Wyatt was reportedly impressed by Vermillion's steadfastness in helping to avenge his brothers.

Curly Bill death refuted 

The Epitaph reported that Curly Bill had been killed, though they noted the repeated denials by the Cowboys. Dick Wright and Tony Kraker insisted they had seen the Cowboys near Drew's Ranch below Contention, who had reported that they had shot the pommel off Wyatt's horse, and he had shot at them without effect.

Wyatt told Flood that Brocius's friends buried Curly Bill on the Patterson ranch near the Babocomari River. Frank Patterson was a member of the Cowboy party, and his ranch was close to the original McLaury ranch site. The McLaurys moved their operation to Sulphur Springs Valley in late 1880. An unknown individual who claimed to be on his way to meet the Earp posse, possibly Kraker or Wright, wrote the Tombstone Nugget on March 26 that they had seen a wagon arrive and carry Curly Bill's body away. Rancher Henry Hooker wrote that Wells Fargo agent John Thacker, himself, went to the place where Curly Bill had been buried and had the body dug up. Thacker identified Curly Bill's body, and saw that it was reinterred."

Johnny Barnes recovered somewhat after the shooting but later died of his wound. Wells, Fargo & Co. undercover agent Fred Dodge, riding with the Cowboys, wrote that Barnes had told him that he had shot Virgil Earp. Dodge also wrote in the 1920s that Barnes had told him that Wyatt Earp had killed Brocius.

Cowboy suspects freed 

On Saturday, March 25, the Tucson Grand Jury indicted Pete Spence, Frank Stilwell, Florentino Cruz, Frederick Bode, and "John Doe" (Fries) for Morgan Earp's murder. Pete Spence's trial began on April 2, but ended on April 5 when the prosecution called Marietta Spence to repeat the testimony she had given at the Coroner's Inquest. The defense objected that her testimony was hearsay and that as a spouse she could not testify against her husband. Without her testimony, the prosecution had insufficient evidence. They dropped its case against Spence and Bode and the court dismissed the charges.

Earp posse pursued by Behan posse 

On the same day, the Earp party arrived from Iron Springs to an area outside Tombstone and met with supporters, including Charlie Smith and Dan Tipton. They were hoping to receive $1,000 contributed by mining owner and Earp supporter E.B. Gage from Smith, but after Smith was arrested by Behan, Tony Kraker and "Whistling Dick" Wright were chosen to carry it, and they had not returned. Gage had meanwhile learned of his mother's death and had left town for the east coast. Later that day the Earp party rode north towards Henderson Ranch near where they ate and fed their horses. Cochise County Deputy Sheriff Frank Hereford was at the ranch but didn't show himself in fear of his safety, although the Earp party had only "the greatest respect" for him.

On March 25, Sheriff Behan formed a posse that included known criminals including Johnny Ringo, Phin Clanton and Johnny Barnes. The 25-man posse left Tombstone and searched east of town for the Earp posse for a while before turning back for the night. At around 6:30 a.m. the next day, Behan led a 15-man posse from Tombstone, headed for the Dragoon Mountains, and they returned that night. The Earp posse camped Sunday night, March 26 a mile north of Henderson Ranch and left at 7:00 a.m. the next day for the Sierra Bonita Ranch of Henry C. Hooker, a wealthy and prominent rancher.

On April 5 The Tombstone Epitaph printed a letter from an unknown member of the Earp party that recited some of the group's actions after leaving Tombstone and revealed that they were still in the area. The next day they headed for Dragoon Summit Station where they awaited the train and a messenger. They stopped the eastbound train at 1 p.m. and searched the carriages but found nothing. It is not known what they were hoping to find.

Arrival at Hooker Ranch 

When they arrived at Hooker's ranch, he congratulated Earp on killing Curly Bill Brocius. He fed the men and their mounts. When Behan's posse was spotted in the distance, Hooker suggested Wyatt make his stand there, but Wyatt moved into the hills about three miles distant near Reilly Hill. When Sheriff Behan and his posse arrived at the Sierra Bonita Ranch on Tuesday morning, March 28, at 7:00 a.m., Hooker refused to provide Behan any information and  "damned the officers and the law they represented." Upon payment, he provided Behan's posse and horses with food and water, but would not supply them with fresh horses. Behan and undersheriff Woods sought the assistance of Indian Scouts under the command of Colonel Biddle at Ft. Grant, but was unsuccessful, even upon offering a $500 reward for assistance. They rejoined the remainder of the posse who had lost the Earp's posse trail and went to Eureka Springs.

Former Pima County Sheriff Bob Paul, who had been in Tombstone at the time and volunteered to ride with the Behan posse, wrote a letter to the Tucson Citizen on March 3, 1898 in response to an earlier story he said was full of errors. He said the Earp posse had told Hooker to tell Behan and his posse where they were camped. Hooker told Behan where the Earps were camped but the posse left in the opposite direction. The Nugget reported that the Behan posse did not return until Friday.

Early that same morning, Dan Tipton arrived in Willcox on the morning train, rented a horse, and started north, presumably towards the Earp's location and carrying the $1,000 from E.B. Gage for the posse. The Nugget reported that Tipton left on the 5 o'clock stage to catch up with the party near Hooker's ranch.

The Earp posse also received some money from Louis Cooley, a stage driver and an employee of Wells Fargo, who gave funds from the express company.  On April 15, Cooley traveled to Contention and Benson on business for Wells Fargo, where he met General Superintendent J.J. Valentine. When he arrived in Willcox to complete his business, Behan was there to arrest him. Behan's warrant accused Cooley of "aiding and abetting the Earps." The Tombstone Epitaph labeled the charges as "frivolous" and said a lawsuit would be filed against Behan. Judge Wells Spicer dismissed the charges.

While the location of the federal posse led by Wyatt Earp was well-known to most members of the public, Behan's posse never caught up with them. For their vain effort to find and arrest Wyatt Earp and the other four charged in Stillwell's murder, Behan's 25 man posse was paid $5 per day plus $3 per day for horse care for the 10 days they were on the trail. The total bill to the county taxpayers was $2,070.70.

Earp posse leaves Arizona Territory 

It also noted that Virgil Earp and his wife were in Los Angeles that week. The newspaper commented, "This is the wisest course they could pursue. Their lives were not safe for a moment in Tombstone, even if they gave themselves up to the authorities, for the sheriff is inimical to them, and they felt that in his hands they would be entirely at the mercy of the cowboys."

But on April 5, a member of the Earp party told The Tombstone Epitaph that they were still in the Arizona Territory. They spotted the Behan posse from that location but avoided drawing their attention. They stayed near Cottonwood the next night, possibly a mill site near the southwest end of the Whetstone Mountains, from which they picked up the trail of fugitive Frank Jackson. The Tombstone Epitaph reported that he was wanted on a $2,500 reward. The Earp posse arrested Jackson on April 4 and turned him over to Detective Jack Duncan.

On April 12, 1882, the Weekly Nugget reported that Wyatt and his fellow "fugitives" were camped in a canyon near the Sierra Bonita Ranch. Wyatt was quoted as publicly challenging Cochise County Sheriff Behan to come find him there.

Sometime from April 10 to April 14, the group headed east out of Arizona. They stopped at Camp Grant before they left the Arizona Territory and Wyatt signed some property over to his sister. Colonel James Biddle told the Earps that warrants had been issued for their arrest and he would have to hold them. He invited them in for a meal. When they finished the meal, they found fresh horses ready for them to continue their ride east.

They rode east again the next day and on April 15, 1882, stopped in Silver City, New Mexico Territory. They spent one night in the home of a friend, and the next day sold their horses and saddles before taking a stage to Deming. From there they took the train to Albuquerque, where they remained for two weeks. To avoid drawing undue attention from their enemies, the Earps visited the offices of the two newspapers and persuaded them to not write any stories about their presence.

Wyatt and Doc Holliday part ways 

Wyatt and Holliday, who had been fast friends since Holliday saved Earp's life in Dodge City during 1878, had a serious disagreement and parted ways in Albuquerque. According to a letter written by former New Mexico Territory Governor Miguel Otero, Wyatt and Holliday were eating at The Retreat Restaurant in Albuquerque owned by "Fat Charlie" "when Holliday said something about Earp becoming 'a damn Jew-boy.' Earp became angry and left…. [Henry] Jaffa told me later that Earp’s woman was a Jewess. Earp did mezuzah when entering the house." Wyatt was staying with a prominent businessman Henry N. Jaffa, who was also president of New Albuquerque’s Board of Trade. Jaffa was also Jewish, and based on the letter, Earp had while staying in Jaffa’s home honored Jewish tradition by performing the mezuzah upon entering his home. According to Otero's letter, Jaffa told him that "Earp’s woman was a Jewess." Earp's anger at Holliday's religious slur may indicate that the relationship between Josephine Marcus and Wyatt Earp was more serious at the time than is commonly known. The Albuquerque Evening Review reported that Doc Holliday "became intoxicated and indiscreet in his remarks, which offended Wyatt and cause the party to break up. Holliday going with Tipton." Holliday told a reporter from the Pueblo Colorado Chieftain two days later that, "We had a little misunderstanding, but it didn't amount to much."

The group split up. They were leaving the uncertain justice of the American Frontier for the more defined justice of the federal and state court system. On about April 29, 1882, Wyatt Earp and his brother Warren, McMaster, Johnson, and Vermillion took the train from Albuquerque to Trinidad and then Gunnison, Colorado, where they set up camp on the outskirts of town. They rarely went into town at first, except for supplies. Eventually, Wyatt took over a faro game at a local saloon. Holliday and Dan Tipton headed to Pueblo and then Denver. The split didn't last long. Less than two weeks later, Holliday was arrested on the Arizona warrant for killing Frank Stilwell. Wyatt intervened on Holliday's behalf and persuaded Trinidad city Marshal Bat Masterson to fabricate bunco charges against Holliday. Masterson then persuaded Colorado Governor Pitkin to refuse to honor Arizona's extradition request. Afterwards, Holliday and Wyatt met again in June 1882 in Gunnison; and then again lastly Holliday was able to see his old friend Wyatt in the late winter of 1886, where they met in the lobby of the Windsor Hotel. Sadie Marcus described the skeletal Holliday as having a continuous cough and standing on "unsteady legs.”

Premature rumors of Wyatt's death 

In Tombstone, rumors flew about the activities of the Earp party. The Tombstone Nugget also printed a story on May 13, 1882, reporting that a rumor that Wyatt had been killed was probably true. They cited that a citizen had seen Wyatt at Henry Hooker's Sierra Bonita Ranch in Arizona during the previous week, and that Wyatt had been killed there "presumably by parties who have been following him since he left this place."  On the same day, the  Los Angeles Herald and Albuquerque Evening Review ran the Tombstone Nuggets story.

Story variations 

Wyatt Earp first wrote down the story about the shootout at Iron Springs more than 11 years after the incident. Wyatt told varied accounts of the  shootout at the springs a number of times during his life. Details varied between the different accounts, like getting his saddle pommel shot off, pulling up his loose cartridge belt, exactly when he helped "Texas Jack" Vermillion out from under his horse, the distance at which they initially encountered the Cowboys, and how far Earp dismounted from "Curly Bill". Before his death in 1887, Doc Holliday left his account of the gunfight in which he credited Wyatt as the individual responsible for shooting Curly Bill and another Cowboy.

Earp extradition sought 

On May 16, 1882, the sheriff of Arapahoe County, Colorado notified Cochise County Sheriff Johnny Behan that he had Wyatt and Warren Earp in his custody, along with Doc Holliday. Behan applied to the governor for money to go to Colorado to bring the Earps back, but Governor Fremont instead gave the funds to Pima County Sheriff Bob Paul. Paul had received word on the same day from Denver that the sheriff there had five of the Earp party in custody. When Paul arrived in Denver, he served a warrant for Doc Holliday's arrest on charges that he killed Frank Stilwell in Tucson. Wyatt Earp, also in Denver, feared for Holliday's life if he was returned to Tombstone. He asked his friend and Trinidad, Colorado Sheriff Bat Masterson to help get Holliday released. Sheriff Masterson appealed to Governor Frederick W. Pitkin and succeeded in getting Holliday released from jail. Paul also knew of warrants for the Earps' arrest, but he was a friend of the men and never served the warrants.

Behan loses popularity 

While Behan sought to arrest the Earps, his reputation among some citizens was very negative. On May 27, 1882, a "strong Democrat" was quoted in a letter in the Yuma, Arizona newspaper The Arizona Sentinel describing the events following the "murder of the noted desperado Frank Stilwell." Readers may want to know "how these so-called Republican outlaws are regarded by decent, law-abiding people in Tombstone, regardless of politics." The writer was of the opinion that Sheriff Behan wanted the requisition from Governor Fremont such that the "object was to have them assassinated... Neither the Sheriff nor any of his deputies have ever turned a hand to find the murderers" of Morgan Earp. "There is no hope for any honest man to get justice here against these scoundrels as long as Behan is in office."  On May 29, 1882, Colorado Governor Pitkin finally refused to honor Arizona's extradition request, allowing Earp and the others to leave the state.

Other suspects 

Wyatt and his posse were unable to apprehend or kill the remaining suspects.
 Hank Swilling was last known when he was questioned in August 1878 about robbing the U.S. Mail.
 Frederick Bode was last listed in the 1880 US Census in Charleston, Pima County.
 Johnny Ringo was found dead on July 14, 1882 in West Turkey Creek Valley, near Chiricahua Peak, with a bullet hole in his right temple. The coroner's jury ruled his death a suicide.
 Ike Clanton was wanted for cattle-rustling when he resisted arrest on June 1, 1887. He attempted to draw his rifle on Detective Jonas V. Brighton who shot Clanton through the heart.
 Phineas Clanton was convicted of grand larceny for cattle rustling in 1887 and served 17 months of a ten year jail sentence in the Yuma Territorial Prison. He died in 1906.
 Pete Spence was convicted of manslaughter in 1883 and served 18 months of a five year sentence in the Yuma Territorial Prison. He married his friend Phineas Clanton's widow in 1910 and died in 1914.

Legacy 

The 1967 film, Hour of the Gun, which stars James Garner as Wyatt Earp, is centered on the vendetta ride. On March 20, 2005, the 122nd anniversary of the killing of Frank Stilwell, a life-sized statue of Holliday and Earp by the sculptor Dan Bates was dedicated by the Southern Arizona Transportation Museum at the restored Historic Railroad Depot in Tucson, Arizona, at the approximate site of the shooting on the train platform. Wyatt Earp later claimed that "Doc and I were the only ones in Tucson at the time Frank Stilwell was killed".

Long after the gunfight, Johnny Behan continued to spread rumors about the Earps. On December 7, 1897, he was quoted in a story in the Washington Post, reprinted by the San Francisco Call, describing the Earp's lawbreaking behavior in Tombstone. After referring to the highly controversial Fitzsimmons-Sharkey fight for which Wyatt Earp was referee, the article quoted Behan:

Wyatt's action in taking justice into his own hands became one of the most well known examples of American frontier justice in American history. Wyatt Earp became the archetypal image of a real-life anti-hero.

In 1927, Earp defended his decisions before the Gunfight at the O.K. Corral and afterward to Stuart Lake, author of the 1931 largely fictionalized biography, Wyatt Earp: Frontier Marshal:

See also 

 List of feuds in the United States
 Ten Percent Ring

References

Further reading 
 
 

Cochise County conflict
Conflicts in 1882
Arizona Territory
American Old West gunfights
Arizona folklore
History of Cochise County, Arizona
Earp family
Crime in Arizona Territory
1882 in Arizona Territory
Vigilantism in the United States
March 1882 events
April 1882 events